This is a list of members of the Victorian Legislative Council from the elections of August–September 1872 to the elections of 12–25 March 1874.

There were six Electoral Provinces and five members elected to each Province.

Note the "Term in Office" refers to that members term(s) in the Council, not necessarily for that Province.

William Mitchell was President of the Council, Robert Hope was Chairman of Committees.

 Michie resigned in March 1873, replaced by Theodotus Sumner in a by-election the same month.
 Murphy resigned in November 1873, replaced by John Wallace in a by-election the same month.
 Turnbull died 21 November 1872, replaced by Francis Murphy in December 1872.

References

 Re-member (a database of all Victorian MPs since 1851). Parliament of Victoria.

Members of the Parliament of Victoria by term
19th-century Australian politicians